Peter Riedemann (Rideman, Rydeman, Ryedeman) (1506 – 1 December 1556) is considered the second founder of the Hutterite brotherhood, a branch of Anabaptist Christianity. Riedemann was born in Hirschberg (Silesia) and died in  Brodsko (Slovakia).

His best-known work is Account of Our Religion, Doctrine and Faith, of the brethren who are called Hutterites of 1540–1541 (original German title Rechenschafft unserer Religion, Leer vnd Glaubens, von den Bruedern so man die Hutterischen nennt), a document summarising the beliefs and practices of his church.

External links 
 Peter Riedemann in Global Anabaptist Mennonite Encyclopedia Online

1506 births
1556 deaths
People from Jelenia Góra
Silesian-German people
Hutterite people
Hutterites in Europe
16th-century German people
16th-century Austrian people
16th-century Hungarian people
Hungarian people of German descent